Chico High School is a four-year comprehensive public high school located in Chico, California, United States. , Chico High School has 2,083 students.

Founded in 1902, it predominantly serves as the senior school for graduates of Chico Junior High School.

In 1996, Chico High School became a California Distinguished School recognized by the California Department of Education. In 1998 and 1999, it was given the National Blue Ribbon School of Excellence, in 2001 it received the National Service-Learning Leader School, and in 2002–2005 it received National Smaller Learning Communities School award.

In 2008, for the first time, Chico High ended off-campus lunch privileges for freshman students.

Since 1967, the school has competed with cross-town rival Pleasant Valley High School at the annual Almond Bowl in junior varsity and varsity football. The game was unnamed in the schools' first three meetings, but local businessmen led by KPAY-AM radio executive Frank Mertz named the contest the "Almond Bowl" before the 1970 clash, when the schools were members of the newly formed Eastern Athletic League. The freshman game is unofficially referred to as the Peanut Bowl; Chico Junior High School played Bidwell Junior High School from the time of Bidwell's establishment in 1958 until 1992, after which freshmen were incorporated into the high schools.

The school's graduation ceremony, held at California State University the evening of June 4, 1987, was featured on America's Funniest Home Videos due to the fact that the university's stadium sprinkler system began spraying water on the graduates unexpectedly. Principal Roger Williams scrambled to place a garbage barrel over one sprinkler head before it inundated the podium.

The school now hosts its graduation ceremony at its newly built Chico High School stadium.

Notable alumni

 Emily Azevedo, Olympic bobsledder (Vancouver 2010), Class of 2001
 Alden G. Barber, Boy Scouts of America leader
 Nelson Briles, former Major League Baseball player with the St. Louis Cardinals, Pittsburgh Pirates, Kansas City Royals, Texas Rangers and Baltimore Orioles, Class of 1961
 Eddie Butts, former National Football League player with the Chicago Cardinals, Class of 1922
 Gerry Conlee, former National Football League player with the Cleveland Rams, Detroit Lions and San Francisco 49ers
Haley Cope, Olympic Swimmer
 Clay Dalrymple, former Major League Baseball player with the Philadelphia Phillies and Baltimore Orioles, Class of 1954
 Amanda Detmer, television and film actress, Class of 1989
 Thomas C. Fleming, influential African American journalist, Class of 1926
 Nahshon Garrett, Cornell wrestler currently competing with Team USA, Class of 2011
 Brian Keyser, former Major League Baseball player with the Chicago White Sox, Class of 1985
 Kurt Kitayama, professional golfer currently competing on the European Tour, Class of 2011
 Matt Lucena, 1995 U.S. Open Tennis Mixed Doubles champion with Meredith McGrath, and NCAA men's tennis doubles champion at the University of California in 1990 with Doug Eisenman and with Bent-Ove Pedersen in 1991, Class of 1988
 George Maderos, former National Football League player with the San Francisco 49ers, Class of 1951
 Vance McHenry, former professional baseball player with the Seattle Mariners
 Jake McLaughlin, actor, Quantico (2015-2018), Believe  (2014)
 Brett Ratliff, National Football League player with the New York Jets and Cleveland Browns, Class of 2003
 Jason Ross, seven-time Emmy Award-winning comedic writer formerly of The Daily Show; currently with The Tonight Show Starring Jimmy Fallon
 Roque Santos, Olympic swimmer (Barcelona 1992), Class of 1986
 Donovan Scott, television and film actor, Class of 1966
 Mike Sherrard, former National Football League player with the Dallas Cowboys, San Francisco 49ers, New York Giants and Denver Broncos, Class of 1981
 Gentry Stein, Yoyo World Champion
 Bill Striegel, former National Football League player with the Philadelphia Eagles, Boston Patriots and Oakland Raiders, Class of 1954

References

External links
Chico Senior High School– official website
Chico Unified School District– official website
Index of Chico High School Yearbooks

Public high schools in California
Educational institutions established in 1902
Buildings and structures in Chico, California
High schools in Butte County, California
Education in Chico, California
1902 establishments in California